Andrew Stevenson (1784–1857) was a politician in the United States.

Andrew Stevenson may also refer to:

 Andrew Stevenson (rower) (born 1957), New Zealand rower
 Andrew Stevenson (rugby union) (1897–1968), Scotland rugby union player
 Andrew Stevenson (baseball) (born 1994), American baseball outfielder
 Andy Stevenson (footballer) (born 1967), English footballer

See also
 Andrew Stephenson (born 1981), British Conservative Party politician